The following is a list of notable people from Kerala, India. The names are classified according to the person's major area of work. For more details please see their respective articles.

Ancient rulers and kings

Early Cheras
The Cheras are referred to as Kedalaputo (Sanskrit: "Kerala Putra") in the Emperor Ashoka's Pali edicts (3rd century BCE). The earliest Graeco-Roman accounts referring to the Cheras are by Pliny the Elder in the 1st century CE, in the Periplus of the 1st century CE, and by Claudius Ptolemy in the 2nd century CE. Greeks and Romans are called "Yavanas" in early Indian literature.
 Uthiyan Cheralathan – earliest known ruler of the Chera family who was also known as "Vanavaramban" Cheral Athan. He is sometimes identified with the Chera ruler who prepared food for the warring cousins at Kurukshetra War in the epic Mahabharata (Akananuru).
 Nedum Cheralathan – Imayavaramban Nedum Cheral Athan, son of Uthiyan Cheral Athan, is the hero of the second decade of Pathitrupathu which was composed by the poet Kaveri Poompattanatthu Kaari Kannanar. The greatest of his enemies were the Kadambas whom he defeated in battles. He also attacked Yavana ships and held Yavana traders ransom.
 Pallaana Chel Kelu Kuttuvan – son of Uthiyan Cheral Athan. Credited as the conqueror of Kongu.
 Kalankakkanni Narmudi Cheral – led an expedition against the Adigaiman Anji of Tagadur. Initially defeated by Nannan of Ezhimala in the battle of Pazhi, later defeated and killed Nannan in the battle of Vakai Perum Turai.
 Chenguttuvan – identified with "Kadal Pirakottiya" Vel Kezhu Kuttuvan, son of Nedum Cheral Athan, celebrated by the poet Paranar in the 5th decade, ascended to the Chera throne after the death of his father. Vel Kezhu Kuttuvan is often identified with the legendary "Chenguttuvan Chera", the most illustrious ruler of the Early Cheras. Under his reign, the Chera territory extended from Kollimalai (near Karur Vanchi) in the east to Thondi and Mantai (Kerala) on the western coast.
 Adu Kottu Cheral Athan – successor of Vel Kezhu Kuttuvan
 Chelva Kadumko Valia Athan – son of Anthuvan Cheral and the hero of the 7th set of poems composed by Kapilar. He defeated the combined armies of the Pandyas and the Cholas. He is sometimes identified as the Ko Athan Cheral Irumporai mentioned in the Aranattar-malai inscription of Pugalur (c. 2nd century CE).
 Perum Cheral Irumporai – "Tagadur Erinta" defeated the combined armies of the Pandyas, Cholas and that of the chief of Tagadur. He captured Tagadur which was ruled by the powerful ruler Adigaman Ezhni. He is also called "the lord of Puzhinadu" and "the lord of Kollimalai" and "the lord of [Poom]Puhar". Puhar was the Chola headquarters. Perum Cheral Irumporai also annexed the territories of a minor chief called Kaluval.
 Illam Cheral Irumporai – defeated the Pandyas and the Cholas and brought immense wealth to his base Vanchi.
 Yanaikatchai Mantaran Cheral Irumporai – ruled from Kollimalai (near Karur Vanchi) in the east to Thondi and Mantai on the western coast. He defeated his enemies in a battle at Vilamkil.
 Kanaikkal Irumporai – said to have defeated a chief called Muvan and imprisoned in him. The Chera then brutally pulled out the teeth of the prisoner and planted them on the gates of the city of Thondi. Upon capture by the Chola ruler Sengannan Kanaikkal committed suicide by starvation.

Kodungallur Cheras / Kulasekharas (Medieval Cheras)
 Kulashekhara Varma (c. 800–c.820 CE)
 Rajashekhara (c. 820–844 CE)
 Sthanu Ravi Varma (844–c. 885 CE)
 Rama Varma (c. 885–917 CE)
 Kota Ravi Varma (917–947 CE)
 Indu Kota Varma (944–962 CE)
 Bhaskara Ravi Varma I (962–1019 CE)
 Bhaskara Ravi Varma II (979–1021 CE)
 Vira Kerala (1021–c. 1028 CE)
 Rajasimha (c. 1028–c.1043 CE)
 Bhaskara Ravi Varma III (c. 1043–c.1082 CE)
 Ravi Rama Varma (c. 1082–1090 CE)

Venad Swaroopam (Later Cheras)
Rulers of Venad trace their origin to the Vel family related to the Ay chiefs of the ancient southern India (c. 1st - 4th century AD). Venad - ruled by hereditary chiefs, acting with the help of a military entourage - emerged as a chiefdom in the state of the Cheras of Kodungallur in c. 8th century.
 Rama Varma Kulashekhara (1090–1102) – mentioned in Rameswarathukoil Inscription as the founder of Venad as an independent state
 Kotha Varma Marthandam, Keezhperoor (1102–1125) – conquered Kottar and Nanjanad from the Pandya Dynasty
 Vira Kerala Varma I, Keezhperoor (1125–1145) – great religious benefactor, responsible for the rebuilding of Padmanabhaswamy and the endowment of Suchindram Temples
 Kodai Kerala Varma, Keezhperoor (1145–1150)
 Vira Ravi Varma, Keezhperoor (1161–1164)
 Vira Kerala Varma II, Keezhperoor (1164–1167)
 Vira Aditya Varma, Keezhperoor (1167–1173)
 Vira Udaya Martanda Varma, Keezhperoor (1173–1192) – established his seat at Kulikkod and allied himself to the Pandya kings
 Devadaram Vira Kerala Varma III, Keezhperoor (1192–1195)
 Vira Manikantha Rama Varma Tiruvadi, Keezhperoor (1195– ?)
 Vira Rama Kerala Varma Tiruvadi, Keezhperoor (1209–1214)
 Vira Ravi Kerala Varma Tiruvadi, Keezhperoor (1214–1240)
 Vira Padmanabha Martanda Varma Tiruvadi, Keezhperoor (1240–1252) – the Pandya kings asserted their dominance over Venad during his reign
 Jayasimha Deva, Keezhperoor (1266–1267) – succeeded in bringing the whole of present-day Kerala under his control. He established his seat at Kollam, the surrounding areas becoming known as Jayasimhanad (Desinganad). His wife Rani Umma Devi was probably a joint ruler with her husband. He died leaving several sons who quarrelled with his nephews over the succession, causing a long and disruptive civil war.
 Ravi Varma, Keezhperoor (1299–1313)
 Vira Udaya Martanda Varma, Keezhperoor (1313–1333)
 Aditya Varma Tiruvadi, Keezhperoor (1333–1335)
 Vira Rama Udaya Martanda Varma Tiruvadi, Keezhperoor (1335–1342)
 Vira Kerala Varma Tiruvadi, Keezhperoor (1342–1363)
 Vira Martanda Varma III, Keezhperoor (1363–1366)
 Vira Rama Martanda Varma, Keezhperoor (1366–1382)
 Vira Ravi Varma, Keezhperoor (1383–1416)
 Vira Ravi Ravi Varma, Keezhperoor (1416–1417)
 Vira Kerala Martanda Varma, Keezhperoor (1383)
 Chera Udaya Martanda Varma, Keezhperoor (1383–1444)
 Vira Ravi Varma, Keezhperoor (1444–1458)
 Sankhara Sri Vira Rama Martanda Varma (1458–1468)
 Vira Kodai Sri Aditya Varma (1468–1484) – established his capital at Kallidaikurichi
 Vira Ravi Ravi Varma (1484–1503) – established his capital at Padmanabhapuram
 Martanda Varma, Kulasekhara Perumal (1503–1504)
 Vira Ravi Kerala Varma, Kulasekhara Perumal (1504–1528) – succeeded as Trippappur Mutta Tiruvadi

Mushika Kingdom (Ezhimalai)
The Mushika kingdom was a kingdom in the early historic south India in present-day Kerala, India, ruled by a royal dynasty of the same name. Its dominions, for most of its recorded history, covered the present-day regions of northern Kerala, Tulunadu and Coorg (southern Karnataka), between the western slopes of the Western Ghats in the east and the Arabian Sea in the west.
 Nannan I - He married the daughter of the Chera King Perunchorruthiyan sometime around the 3rd Century BCE. Sangam texts as well as several versions of the Mahabharata cite a Chera king by the same name to have fed the rival armies in the Great War. Under Nannan, an able military commander also, Mushika kingdom transformed into a force in South India, and stretched into Wynad and Gudalur Districts in the foothills of the Western Ghats, and the northern parts of present-day Coimbatore district, Tamil Nadu. Eager to expand his kingdom, Nannan waged war against the Cheras, and successfully defeated the Chera commanders at the Battle of Pazhi.
 Isanavarman – married a Chedi princess Nandini. He also married the daughter of the then Chola King. Their son Nrpurama was the next king.
 Virochana – defeated the Pallavas, and married Harini, the daughter of the Pallava King.
 Kandan Kari Varman – (The Mushika king who lived in the Eleventh Century CE) is referred to as a close relative of the Ay-Chera King Vira Kerala. Several inscriptions exist in both the Kasargod-Kannur area (in Eramam) and in the Thiruvananthapuram-Kanyakumari area, throwing light on the synchronism between Rajendra Chola, Chera Vira Kerala and Kandan Kari Varman and that the latter Mushika King belonged to the Ay Dynasty.

Kola Swarupam (Chirakkal Rajah)
Kolattunādu (Kola Swarupam, as Kingdom of Cannanore in foreign accounts, Chirakkal (Chericul) in later times) was one of the three most powerful feudal kingdoms on the Malabar Coast during the arrival of Portuguese India Armadas, the others being Zamorin's Calicut and Quilon. The Kolathiris are praised as Vadakkan Perumals ("Kings of the North") by the noted "Keralolpathi". Kolathiri were also known as Chirakkal Raja or King of Chirakkal.
 Rama Ghata Mushaka – established the lineage of Kola Swarupam;
 Vikrama Rama an inscription dating to 929 AD mentions about one Vikrama Rama identifiable with the ruler Vikrama Rama who appears in the Mushika Vamsa
 Udaya Varma, also known as "Rama Ghata Muvar" – mentioned on the inscription from 10th century AD
 Eraman Chemani (Rama Jayamani) – the inscription from the Tiruvattur temple mentions him to be identifiable as the king who appears as the 109th ruler in the Mushika Vamsa

Arrakal Kingdom
Arakkal kingdom (Kingdom of Cannanore, Sultanate of Laccadive and Cannanore) was a former city-state on the Malabar Coast, ruled by a dynasty of the same name. The ruling King was called Ali Raja ("the Sea Ruler") and the ruling queen was called Arakkal Beevi. The royal family is said to be originally a branch of the Kolattiri, descended from a princess of that family who converted to Islam. They owed allegiance to the Kolattiri rulers, whose ministers they had been at one time. The Arakkal family was the only Muslim royal family of Kerala to control parts of the coast and Lakshadweep.
 Ali Raja Ali II – known to have deployed his naval Mappila forces on behalf of the Mughal Emperor Aurangzeb during the Child's War

Samoothiri of Kozhikode
Zamorin of Calicut (Saamoothiri, സാമൂതിരി) – rulers of Malabar from the 14th and 18th century AD. At the peak of their reign, the Samoothiris ruled over a region from Kollam (Quilon) to Panthalayini Kollam (Koyilandy).
 Mana Vikrama (Manikkan) – legendary founder of the ruling family
 Mana Vikrama the Great – the Russian merchant of Tver Afanasy Nikitin (1468–1474) visited Kozhikode during his reign
 Mana Vikrama III – the expulsion of the Portuguese from Chaliyam (1571) by his forces
 Mana Vikrama (Saktan Tampuran) – uncle of the author of the Krishnanatakam
 Mana Veda – author of the Krishnanatakam
 Asvati Tirunal – his forces undertook the expulsion of Portuguese from Kodungallur (1662)
 Puratam Tirunal – Portuguese were expelled from Kochi under his reign (1663)
 Uttrattati Tirunal – ceded Chetwai to the Dutch
 Bharani Tirunal Mana Vikram – the terror of the Dutch; two Mamankams (1694 and 1695)
 Nileswaram Tirunal – adoptions from Nileswaram (1706 and 1707)
 Samoothiri from Kilakke Kovilakam (1741–1746)
 Putiya Kovilakam (1746–1758) – the Dutch War was fought during his term (1753–1758).
 Kilakke Kovilakam (1758–1766) – battles with Travancore and the invasion of Mysore; committed suicide; annexed by Mysore
 Putiya Kovilakam (1766–1788)
 Kerala Varma Vikrama (1788–1798) – Treaty of Seringapatam (1792)
 Krishna Varma (1798–1806) – agreement of 1806 with EIC (died in 1816)

Purannatt Swarupam (Cotiote Rajah)
 Kerala Varma Pazhassi Raja – known as the Lion of Kerala; a prince from the royal dynasty of Pazhassi Kottayam.  He was the only person to defeat Arthur Wellesley, 1st Duke of Wellington in a war.

Kings of Travancore
In the 18th century, Marthanda Varma (1706–1758), of the Trippappoor, successfully developed the centralised state of Travancore. Varma routed all of major Nair nobles in Travancore, organised a standing army, defeated most of the chiefdoms in central Kerala, entered into strategic alliances with Europeans, supported Kerala merchants (Syrian Christian) in the place of the Europeans, and eventually formed one of the first modern states of southern India.
 Marthanda Varma Kulasekhara Perumal (1729–1758)
 Balarama Varma Kulasekhara Perumal – Dharma Raja Karthika Thirunal (1758–1798)
 Balarama Varma Kulasekhara Perumal (1798–1810)
 Gouri Laksmibhai Ranee (1810–1815)
 Gouri Parvathibhai Ranee (1815–1829)
 Swathi Thirunal Rama Varma Kulasekhara Perumal (1829–1847)
 Uthram Thirunal Marthanda Varma Maharaja (1847–1860)
 Ayilyam Thirunal Rama Varma Maharaja (1860–1880)
 Visakham Thirunal Rama Varma Maharaja (1880–1885)
 Shri Moolam Thirunal Maharajah (1885–1924)
 Sethu Laksmibhai Ranee (1924–1933)
 Shri Chithira Thirunal Balarama Varma Maharajah (1933–1949) – last King of Travancore; Rajpramukh of Thiru-Kochi

Dewan of Travancore
 Raja Kesavadas – Dewan of Travancore during the reign of Dharma Raja

Dewan of Malabar
 E.K Krishnan – Dewan of Malabar district, during the deputy collecter of state and district.

Kings of Cochin
 Unniraman Koikkal I (1500–1503)
 Veera Kerala Varma (1537–1565)
 Kesava Rama Varma (1565–1601)
 Rama Varma (1701–1721)
 Rama Varma Sakthan Thampuran (1790–1805)
 Rama Varma XV (1895–1914)
 Kerala Varma (1946–1948)
 Rama Varma Pareekshithu Thampuran (1948–1964) – last king of Cochin

Villarvattom Dynasty (vassal principality of the Kingdom of Cochin)
 King Thoma of Villarvattom.

Heads of state

President of India 
 K.R. Narayanan – 10th President of India (1997–2002), 9th Vice-President of India (1992–1997)

President of Singapore 
 Devan Nair – 3rd President of Singapore (1981–1985)

Prime Minister of Malaysia
  Mahathir Mohamad - 4thPrime Minister of Malaysia (1981-2003), (2018-2020)

Parliament of India

Rajya Sabha
 P. J. Kurien – 18th Deputy Chairman of the Rajya Sabha (2012–2018)

Lok Sabha
 T. K. Viswanathan – Secretary General of the Lok Sabha (15th)

Governors of states
 Pattom A. Thanu Pillai
 fourth Governor of Punjab, 1962–1964
 fourth Governor of Andhra Pradesh, 1964–1968
 P.C. Alexander
 ninth Governor of Tamil Nadu, 1988–1990
 seventeenth Governor of Maharashtra, 1993–2002
 seventh Governor of Goa, 1996–1998
 P V Cherian – eighth Governor of Maharashtra, 1964–1969
 M. M. Jacob – ninth Governor of Meghalaya, 1995–2007
 A. J. John, Anaparambil – fourth Governor of Madras, 1956–1957
 M K Narayanan – 24th Governor of West Bengal, 2010–2014
 Madathilparampil Mammen Thomas Governor of Nagaland, 1990–1992 
 Vakkom Purushothaman – eleventh Governor of Mizoram, 2011–2014
 K. Sankaranarayanan – 21st Governor of Maharashtra, 2010–2014
 K.K. Viswanathan – sixth Governor of Gujarat, 1973–1978
 Kummanam Rajasekharan, BJP – 18th Governor of Mizoram, 2018–2019
 P. S. Sreedharan Pillai, BJP – 19th Governor of Mizoram, 2019–present

Council of Ministers, India

Union Cabinet Ministers
 John Mathai – Minister for Finance (1948–1950)
 V. K. Krishna Menon – Minister for Defence (1957–1962)
 Panampilly Govinda Menon – Minister for Law and Railways (1969–1970)
 Ravindra Varma – Minister for Labour (1977–79)
 K. P. Unnikrishnan – Minister for Telecommunications in the V P Singh Cabinet (1989–90)
 K. Karunakaran – Minister for Industries (1995)
A.K. Antony – Minister of Defence (2006–2014) – Minister for Consumer Affairs, Food and Public Distribution (1993–1995)
 Vayalar Ravi – Minister for Overseas Indian Affairs (2006–2014) – Minister for Civil Aviation (2011)

Minister of State (Independent Charges)
 M. P. Veerendra Kumar – Ministry of Labour with additional charge of Urban Affairs (1997–1998)
 K. V. Thomas – Ministry of Consumer Affairs, Food and Public Distribution (2009–2014)
 Alphons Kannanthanam, BJP - Union Minister of State for Electronics and Information Technology, Culture, and Tourism (2016–2019)

Minister of State (MoS)
 Lakshmi N. Menon – Ministry of External Affairs of India (1957–1966)
 Mullappally Ramachandran – Ministry of Home Affairs (2009–2014) – Agriculture and Cooperation (1991–1996)
 M. M. Jacob – Ministries of Parliamentary Affairs, Water Resources and Home Affairs at different periods (1987–93)
 O. Rajagopal, BJP – Ministry of Parliamentary Affairs, Railways, Urban Development, Defence (1999–2004)
 Shashi Tharoor – Ministry of External Affairs of India (2009–2010), Minister of State for Human Resource Development (2012–2014)
 E. Ahamed – Ministry of External Affairs (2011– ); Minister of State for Human Resource Development; Minister of State for Railways (2004–2014)
 K. C. Venugopal – Ministry of Power (2011–2014)
 Kodikkunnil Suresh – Ministry of Labour and Employment (2012–2014)
 V Muraleedharan, BJP – Minister of state for External Affairs and Parliamentary Affairs

Chief Ministers

From Kerala

From Tamil Nadu

1. M. G. Ramachandran, 3rd CM of Tamil Nadu
2. V N Janaki Ramachandran, 4th CM of Tamil Nadu

Ministers

Other states
 K. J. George – Minister of Home, Karnataka (2013–2016)

Political leaders
 A. P. Udhayabhanu – Member Travancore State Assembly (1944–1952)
 C.P.Mathen – Member of Parliament (1952); Indian Ambassador to Sudan (1957–1960)
 A.K. Gopalan , Lok Sabha (1952–1977); Communist Party of India (Marxist)
 Mathai Manjooran – member of Rajya Sabha (1952–1954)
 K. M. George – member, Kerala Legislative Assembly (1960–1964) founder Kerala Congress (1964)
 K.Damodaran (Damodaran Kizhedath) – Member Rajya Sabha (1964–1970); the first 'Malayalee Communist' (1937)
 Thennala Balakrishna Pillai – Member Rajya Sabha, three terms (1991–1998; 2003–2009)
 P. Krishna Pillai – founder of communist movement in Kerala (1937)
 Azhikodan Raghavan – Communist Party Leader in Kerala
 Pannyan Raveendran – Member Loka Sabha (2006–2012); Kerala State Secretary, Communist Party of India (2012–2015)
 Pinarai Vijayan – Chief Minister, Kerala; Kerala State Secretary, CPI(M) (1998–2015), and member of the CPI(M) Politburo (2002–incumbent)
 Prakash Karat – General Secretary, CPI(M) of India (2005–2015)
 Panakkad Shihab Thangal (Panakkad Sayeed Mohammedali Shihab Thangal) – President of the Kerala state committee of the IUML (1975–2009)
 Ramesh Chennithala – President, Kerala Pradesh Congress Committee (2005-incumbent); four times Lok Sabha MP (1989–2004)
 Anathalavattom Anandan – President, CITU State Committee; Vice Chairman, Apex Body for Coir; State Secretariat Member, CPI(M); three times MLA from Attingal Constituency 
 P. Chacko MLA – Member, Kerala Legislative Assembly (1960–1964)
 Dr. George Thomas – Kerala Legislative Assembly (1967–1970)
 M. T. Jacob – Mayor of Aluva (2010–incumbent)
 Vakkom Bharathan – CPI(M) leader, trade union leader
 Kummanam Rajasekharan – former Mizoram Governor; former BJP Kerala state president
 P.J. Kurien – Member and Deputy Speaker of Rajya Sabha from Kerala (2012–incumbent)
 V.S. Achuthanandan – former chief minister Kerala (2006–11)
 P. K. Jayalakshmi – youngest minister in the Oommen Chandy Government (elected to office at age 30); first Adivasi Minister of Kerala
 K.Karunakaran – former chief minister Kerala (3235 days)
 Oommen Chandy – former chief minister Kerala (2446 days)
 O. Rajagopal – former Central Minister, two times MP, first BJP MLA in Kerala
 Suresh Gopi – BJP Rajyasabha MP from Kerala; National Award-winning superstar actor
 Richard Hay – BJP Loksabha MP from Kerala, second Malayalee nominated as Anglo Indian MP
 V Muraleedharan – Union Minister of State for External Affairs and Parliamentary Affairs, BJP Rajyasabha MP from Kerala
 Alphonse Kannanthanam – former Central Tourism, IT, Electronics Minister; BJP Rajyasabha MP from Kerala

Award winners

Bharat Ratna
The Bharat Ratna is the highest civilian award of the Republic of India.

Padma Vibhushan

The Padma Vibhushan is India's second highest civilian honour.
 V.K. Krishna Menon – Public Affairs (1954)
 John Matthai – Literature & Education (1959)
 Kalpathi Ramakrishna Ramanathan (K. R. Ramanathan) – Science & Engineering (1976)
 Mambillikalathil Kumar Menon (M. G. K. Menon) – Civil Service (1985)
 V. R. Krishna Iyer – Public Affairs (1999)
 Kakkadan Nandanath Raj (K. N. Raj) – Literature & Education (2000)
 Adoor Gopalakrishnan – Arts (2006)
 George Sudarshan – Science & Engineering (2007)
 ONV Kurup – Literature & Education (2011)
 K. J. Yesudas – singing (2017)

Padma Bhushan

The Padma Bhushan is India's third highest civilian honour. (This is not a complete list.)

 Vallathol Narayana Menon – Literature & Education (1954); poet (Mahakavi)
Mira Nair – Film Direction/Arts (2012) 
 Lakshmi Nandan Menon (Lakshmi N. Menon) – Public Affairs (1957)
 Kumar Padma Siva Shankara Menon (K. P. S. Menon (senior)) – Civil Service (1958)
 Mannathu Padmanabhan, (Mannathu Padmanabha Pillai) – Social Work (1966)
 K.P. Kesava Menon – Public Affairs (1966)
 Govinda Shankara Kurup (G. Sankara Kurup) – Literature & Education (1968); poet
 Poyipilli Kunju Kurup, (Guru Kunchu Kurup) – Arts (1971)
 Kandathil Mammen Cherian – Literature & Education (1971)
 Pothan Joseph – Literature & Education (1973)
 George Sudarshan – Literature & Education (1976)
 Prem Nazir – Arts (1983); actor
 Thakazhi Sivasankara Pillai – Literature & Education; (1985) novelist and short story writer
 Nalapat Balamani Amma – Literature & Education (1987); poet
 Marathanda Verma Sankaran Valiathan, (M. S. Valiathan) – Medicine (1990)
 Thomas Kailath – Science and Engineering (2009)
 Thayil Jacob Sony George (T. J. S. George) – Literature & Education (2011)
 K.J. Yesudas – Arts (2002); classical singer and musician
 Jacob Cherian – Social Work (1999)
 Mohanlal Viswanathan Nair Arts (2019); Art, film Acting
 S Nambi Narayan (Nambi Narayanan) – (2019); Science & Engineering-Space
 K. S. Chithra - (2021); Arts

Padma Shri

The Padma Shri is India's fourth highest civilian honour. (This is not a complete list.)

 Perakath Verghese Benjamin – Medicine (1955)
 Guru Kunchu Kurup – Arts (1965)
 Kandathil Mammen Cherian – Literature & Education (1965)
 C.K. Nair Alias V. Kunchu Nair – Arts (1971)
 Thikkurissy Sukumaran Nair – Arts, poet and actor (1973)
 Mani Madhava Chakyar – Arts, Koodiyattam and Chakyar Koothu (1974)
 K.J. Yesudas – Arts, classical singer and musician (1975)
 Vaikom Muhammad Basheer – Literature & Education (1982)
 Manathoor Devasia Valsamma, M. D. Valsamma – Sports (1983)
 Adoor Gopalakrishnan –  Arts (1984); director, screenwriter, producer
 P. T. Usha – Sports (1985)
 Bharath Gopi – Arts (1991); actor
 P. I. Mohammed Kutty (Mammootty) – Arts (1998); actor
 Viswanathan Mohanlal – Arts (2001); actor
 Rajagopalan Krishnan Vaidyan – Ayurveda (2003)
 Shobana Chandrakumar – Arts (2006); actress and Bharatanatyam dancer
 Sugathakumari – Literature & Education (2006)
 T. K. Alex – Science and Technology (2007) 
 Thilakan – Arts, actor (2009)
 K. Viswanathan – Social Service (2009)
 Palpu Pushpangadan – Science and Engineering (2010)
 Resul Pokutty – Arts (2010); sound editor
 K. S. Chithra – Arts (2005); singer
 Balachandra Menon – Arts (2007); acting, direction, script writer
 Shaji N.Karun – Arts (2011); director/cinematographer
 Jose Chacko Periappuram – Medicine (2011); first heart transplant Kerala
 Gopalan Nair Shankar – Science and Engineering (2011); architecture
 Kalamandalam Sivan Namboodiri – Arts (2012); Indian classical dance – Kutiyattam 
 Soman Nair Priyadarsan – Arts (2012); cinema direction 
 J. Hareendran Nair – Medicine (2012); Ayurveda 
 Pepita Seth – Literature and Education (2012)
 Madhu – Arts (2013)
 Padma Shri Kalamandalam Kshemavathy – Arts; dance
 K. P. Haridas – Medicine (2015); surgery
 Jayaram – Arts, cinema acting
 N. Balakrishnan Nair – Medicine (1984)
 R.K. Krishna Kumar – contributions to Indian trade and industry (2009)
 K. K. Muhammed – Others - Archaeology (2019)
 Thalappil Pradeep - Science and Technology (2020)
 O. M. Nambiar - Sports (2021)
 Kaithapram Damodaran Namboothiri (Kaithapram) - Arts (2021);

National Medal of Science
The National Medal of Science is an honor bestowed by the President of the United States to individuals in science and engineering who have made important contributions to the advancement of knowledge in the fields of behavioral and social sciences, biology, chemistry, engineering, mathematics and physics.

 Thomas Kailath (2012) – presented by President Barack Obama in 2014 for "transformative contributions to the fields of information and system science, for distinctive and sustained mentoring of young scholars, and for translation of scientific ideas into entrepreneurial ventures that have had a significant impact on industry"

Academy Awards
The Academy Awards also known as the Oscars are a set of 24 awards for artistic and technical merit in the film industry, given annually by the Academy of Motion Picture Arts and Sciences (AMPAS), to recognize excellence in cinematic achievements as assessed by the Academy's voting membership.

 Resul Pookutty – Best Sound Mixing (2009) along with Ian Tapp and Richard Pryke for his work in Slumdog Millionaire

Booker Prize
The Booker Prize (formerly known as the Booker–McConnell Prize and the Booker Prize for Fiction) is a literary prize awarded each year for the best original novel written in the English language and published in the UK.

 Arundhati Roy – awarded the 1997 Booker Prize for her novel The God of Small Things

Government and world organisations

Deputy Collector
Choorayi Kanaran– (1812-1876) was the first Deputy Collector of India.

Indian Administrative Service
Moorkoth Ramunni –(1915-2009 the first indian Administrative officer (IAS) from dharmadam village.

Members of the Imperial Civil Service 
 K P S Menon Sr. – First Foreign Secretary of India and the 1st Ambassador of India to China
 V. P. Menon – Political Reforms Commissioner to the Viceroy of India Lord Louis Mountbatten
 N. R. Pillai – First Cabinet Secretary (1950–1953)
 M. K. Vellodi – Third Cabinet Secretary (1957–1958)

Civil Services of India

Cabinet Secretaries 
 Sir N R Pillai – first Cabinet Secretary of India 
 T.N.Seshan – 18th Cabinet Secretary (1989–1989)
 K. M. Chandrasekhar – 29th Cabinet Secretary (2007–2011)

Members 

 P.J Thomas Parakunnel – first Chief Economic Advisor of India
 T. K. A. Nair – former Adviser and Principal Secretary to the Prime Minister of India
 Anna Malhotra – first female member of the Indian Administrative Service
 Shivshankar Menon – National Security Advisor to the Prime Minister of India
 Jyotindra Dixit – former National Security Advisor to the Prime Minister of India
 Nirupama Rao – Ambassador of India to United States of America
 Ranjan Mathai – 28th Foreign Secretary of India
 Gopal Pillai – former Home Secretary of India
 Kavalam Panikkar – former Home Secretary of India
 Hormis Tharakan – former Chief of the Research and Analysis Wing
 P. J. Thomas – 14th Central Vigilance Commissioner of India
 R.B. Sreekumar – former Director General of Police of Gujarat
 Abdul Rahman – former Director General of Police of Karnataka
 Letika Saran – former Director General of Police of Tamil Nadu
 Moorkoth Ramunni – fourth Administrator of Lakshadweep

Members of the United Nations 

 Chandran Nair – Civil servant with UNESCO (1981–2004)
 Vijay K. Nambiar – Under-Secretary-General of the United Nations (2007–2012) 
 Shashi Tharoor – Under-Secretary-General of the United Nations (2001–2007)
 Ajay Prabhakar – Country Programme Coordinator of the United Nations (2001–2014)

International Monetary Fund 
 Gita Gopinath – First woman Chief Economist of the IMF (2019–)

Military leaders

Early Modern Period
 Edachena Kunkan – Chieftain of Nair clan and military commander of Pazhassi Raja
 Thalakkal Chanthu – Chieftain of Kurichya clan and military commander of Pazhassi Raja
 Iravikkutti Pillai – Commander-in-Chief of the Venad Kingdom of present-day Kerala, India

Contemporary period

Army 
 General Sundararajan Padmanabhan – 22nd General of the Indian Army and Chief of Army Staff of the Indian Army (2000–2002)
 Lieutenant General Philip Campose – Vice Chief of the Army Staff of the Indian Army
 Lieutenant General Satish Nambiar – Head of Mission of the United Nations Protection Force (1992–1993)
 Major General Jai Shanker Menon – Head of Mission and Force Commander of United Nations Disengagement Observer Force
 Lieutenant General Bobby Cherian Mathews – General officer commanding of Konark Corps
 Lieutenant General G.M. Nair – Military Secretary of India (2010-?)
 Lieutenant General K.P. Candeth – Deputy Chief of Army Staff (1965–1971?)
 Havildar Thomas Philipose – medal winner in the Indo-Pakistani War of 1971

Air Force 
 Moorkoth Ramunni (15 September 1915 – 9 July 2009) was the first Malayali pilot in the Royal Indian Air Force.
Param Vishist Seva Medal holders
 Air Marshal E.P.R. Nair – Commanding-in Chief of the Training Command, Indian Air Force (1981–1985)
 Air Marshal K.N. Nair – Commanding-in Chief of the Eastern Air Command, Indian Air Force 
 Air Marshal Narayan Menon – Air Officer-in-Charge (Personnel), Air Headquarters (1999–2004)

Navy
 Admiral Ronald Lynsdale Pereira – 9th Chief of Naval Staff of the Indian Navy (1979–1982), former Flag Officer Commanding-in-Chief of the Eastern Fleet (FOCEF), Eastern Naval Command, former Flag Officer Commanding-in-Chief of the Southern Naval Command and former Flag Officer Commanding-in-Chief of the Western Naval Command
 Vice-Admiral K. N. Sushil – former Flag Officer Commanding-in-Chief of the Southern Naval Command
 Radhika Menon – India's first female Merchant Navy captain.

Jurists

Chief Justice of India
K. G. Balakrishnan – 37th Chief Justice of India (2007–2010)

Judges of the Supreme Court of India

K. K. Mathew (1971–1976)
V.R. Krishna Iyer (1973–1980)
 V. Balakrishna Eradi (1981–1987)
M. Fathima Beevi (1989–1992) – first woman Judge of the Supreme Court of India 
K. S. Paripoornan (1994–1997)
 Kurian Joseph (2013–)

Women Judges of the Supreme Court of India
M. Fathima Beevi (1989–1992) – first woman Judge of the Supreme Court of India

Women Judges of the High Court
 Smt. Justice Anna Chandy – Judge of the High Court of Kerala (1959–1967) and the first woman in India to be a judge of a High Court
 Kumari Justice P. Janaki Amma – second woman Judge of the High Court of Kerala (1974–1982)

Academia

Ancient mathematicians
 Madhava of Sangamagrama (c.1350–c.1425) – astronomer-mathematician
Vatasseri Parameshvara Nambudiri (c. 1380–1460) – major Indian mathematician and astronomer of the Kerala school of astronomy and mathematics
Nilakantha Somayaji (14 June 1444 – 1544), major astronomer-mathematician of Kerala school of astronomy and mathematics
 Jyeshtadeva (c. 1500–c. 1610) – astronomer-mathematician of the Kerala school of astronomy and mathematics; author of a treatise on calculus
Achyuth Pisharodi (c. 1550 at thrikkandiyur (aka Kundapura), Tirur, Kerala, India – 7 July 1621 in Kerala) Sanskrit grammarian, astrologer, astronomer and mathematician
Melpathur Narayana Bhattathiri (1560–1646/1666) – member of Kerala school of astronomy and mathematics and a mathematical linguist

Scientists
 K. R. Ramanathan – physicist, meteorologist and first director of Physical Research Laboratory, Ahmedabad; President of the International Union of Geodesy and Geophysics (1954–57)
 Tessy Thomas (1963–) – Indian scientist and Director General of Aeronautical Systems and the former Project Director for Agni-IV missile in Defence Research and Development Organisation. She is the first woman scientist to head a missile project in India. She is known as the 'Missile Woman' of India.
 V. R. Lalithambika (1962–) – Indian scientist working with the Indian Space Research Organisation (ISRO); will lead the Gaganyaan mission as the Director of the Indian Human Spaceflight Programme which is intended to send Indian astronauts in the space by 2022
 Krishnaswamy Kasturirangan – space scientist who headed the Indian Space Research Organisation (ISRO)  1994–2003 He is presently Chancellor of Central University of Rajasthan. He is the former chancellor of Jawaharlal Nehru University and the chairman of Karnataka Knowledge Commission. He is a former member of the Rajya Sabha (2003–09) and a former member of the now defunct Planning Commission of India. He was also the Director of the National Institute of Advanced Studies, Bangalore, from April 2004 to 2009.

Faculty

 George Sudarsan – Padma Vibhushan Emeritus professor
 Thomas Kailath – Padma Bhushan; Professor of Engineering
 Faisal Kutty – Professor of Law
 George Varghese – Professor of Computer Science
 K. Mani Chandy – Professor of Computer Science
 Mathai Varghese – Professor of Mathematics
 Pulickel Ajayan – Professor of Engineering
 Thomas Zacharia – computer scientist
 T. Pradeep – Professor of Chemistry
Shree K. Nayar – Professor of Computer Science

 Rev. Fr. Dr. V.C. Samuel – Theologian, Historian, Author, Polyglot and Ecumenical Leader
 P. N. Vinayachandran – Associate Professor of Oceanography
 Thanu Padmanabhan – professor
 Kuruvilla Pandikattu – Professor of Philosophy
 G. Balakrish Nair –  director
 Prahlad Vadakkepat – professor and robotics scientist
 K. R. K. Easwaran – Astra Chair Professor of the Indian Institute of Science

Heads of institutions
 John Palocaren - Founding principal of St. Thomas College, Thrissur
 Mathai Varghese – Director of the Institute for Geometry and its Applications (IGA), Adelaide
 Eluvathingal Devassy Jemmis – Director of Indian Institute of Science Education and Research, Thiruvananthapuram
 M. G. K. Menon – former President of the Indian Statistical Institute
 V. N. Rajasekharan Pillai – 6th Vice Chancellor of Indira Gandhi National Open University
 Salim Gangadharan – Chairman, South Indian Bank and Regional Director, Kerala and Lakshadweep

Medical sciences
 Abraham Verghese – Professor of Medicine and Senior Associate Chair of Department of Internal Medicine at Stanford University School of Medicine
 Mani Menon – Director of the Vattikuti Urology Institute at the Henry Ford Hospital
 Thomas Thomas – first Indian cardio-thoracic surgeon
 M. Krishnan Nair – leading oncologist
 M. S. Valiathan – cardiac surgeon; former Vice Chancellor, Manipal University
 R. Kesavan Nair – Kerala's first civil surgeon
 Vaidyaratnam P. S. Warrier – Ayurvedic physician and founder of the Kottakkal Arya Vaidya Sala
 Salim Yusuf – Director of Population Health Research Institute, Canada
 Rajagopalan Krishnan Vaidyan – Ayurvedic physician
 Mohan D. Nair – Indian pharmaceutical scientist and author
 Ayyathan Janaki Ammal (1881-1945) was the first female doctor in Kerala.

Humanities and social sciences
 Nivedita Menon – feminist writer; professor of political thought at Jawaharlal Nehru University

Business and commerce 

 Rajeev Madhavan – entrepreneur 
 Rajesh Gopinathan – CEO of Tata Consultancy Services
 Thomas Kurian – Global President of Product Development at Oracle Corporation
 Reji Abraham – Managing Director of ABAN Group of Companies
 C J George – founder and CEO of Geojit Financial Services
 Kris Gopalakrishnan – Co-Chairman and former CEO of Infosys Technologies
 S. D. Shibulal – CEO and Managing Director of Infosys Technologies
 T K Kurien – CEO of Wipro
 RK Krishna Kumar – trustee of Sir Dorabji Tata Trust and Sir Ratan Tata Trust
 R Gopalakrishnan – Executive Director of Tata Sons
 Mavila Nair – former Chairman and Managing Director of Union Bank of India
 B. Ravi Pillai – Indian business magnate
 George Alexander Muthoot – Managing Director of Muthoot Finance & Muthoot Group
 Verghese Kurien – founder Chairman of Gujarat Co-operative Milk Marketing Federation Ltd.
 Thakiyudeen Wahid – owner of East West Airlines
 K.M. Mammen Mappilai – founder of MRF Tyres and Manorama publications
 C. P. Krishnan Nair – founder of the Leela Group of Hotels
 Rajmohan Pillai – Chairman of Beta Group
 Kochouseph Chittilappilly – Managing Director of V Guard Industries Ltd
 M. A. Yousuf Ali – founder of EMKE Group, Lulu Hypermarkets and Supermarkets in United Arab Emirates
 Beena Kannan – Managing Director and Lead Designer of Seematti
 Nadakkal Parameswaran Pillai or "Coffee House Pillai" – co-founder of Indian Coffee Houses in Kerala
 Byju Raveendran – founder of Think and Learn Private Ltd, popularly known as BYJU'S - The Learning App, the first investment in Asia from the Chan Zuckerberg Initiative It is considered to be one among the only few Indian consumer startups that has gone global, particularly with the 2017 acquisition of TutorVista.
 Ajit Balakrishnan – founder and Chairman of Rediff
 Dileep K Nair – first Chancellor of North East Frontier Technical University; publisher of The Engineers Outlook Magazine
 PNC Menon – founder of Sobha Developers Limited
 Arun M. Kumar – Chairman and Chief Executive Officer at KPMG India
 Mathunny Mathews – former MD of Al-Sayer Group; former Chairman of Jabriya Indian School; co-founder of Indian Arts Circle, Kuwait

Social reformers

Independence activists

 Sir Chettur Sankaran Nair – KCIE, President of the Indian National Congress (1897–1898)
 Lakshmi Sehgal – as Captain Lakshmi, she commanded the Jhansi Rani Regiment of the INA under Netaji Subhash Chandra Bose
 Veliyankode Umar Khasi – mystic leader and Muslim scholar, freedom fighter and poet
 N.P. Nayar – administrator of Azad Hind Dal
 Ammu Swaminathan
 Accamma Cherian – Jhansi Rani of Travancore
 Mohammed Abdul Rahiman – freedom fighter and former KPCC President
 Vakkom Majeed – former Member of Travancore-Cochin State Assembly
 T. M. Varghese – Minister of Travancore-Cochin
 George Joseph – lawyer, trade unionist and nationalist activist
 C. Kesavan – Chief Minister of Travancore-Cochin
 K. Kelappan – leader of the Payyanur Salt Satyagraha and the Guruvayur Satyagraha
 Vaikom Muhammad Basheer – Malayalam fiction writer, humanist, freedom fighter, novelist and short story writer
 K. P. Kesava Menon – founder-editor of the Mathrubhumi newspaper
 A. K. Gopalan – founder leader of the Communist Party of India
 Velu Thampi Dalava 
 Ammu Swaminathan 
 A. J. John, Anaparambil
 Nettur. P. Damodaran – social worker
 Moidu Moulavi – leader of the Indian National Congress
 K. Kumar (Kumarji) – Gandhian nationalist, orator and reformer who revived the banned Swadeshabhimani newspaper

Social reformers

 Adi Sankara (788–820) – saint, poet, philosopher and reviver of Hinduism in India
 Ayyankali – leader of Dalits
 Kallingal Madathil Rarichan Moopan - (1856-1919) Kozhikode social reformer and Sreekandeswara Temple construction activity.
 K. M. Seethi – Saheb Bahadur, usually referred to as Seethi Saheb
 Chattampi Swamikal (1853–1925) – social reformer
 C. Kesavan – Chief Minister of erstwhile state of Travancore-Cochin, 1951–1952
 Kuriakose Elias Chavara – social reformer and Syrian Catholic saint
 Lalithambika Antharjanam – social reformer and writer
 K. P. Kesava Menon –  founder of Mathrubhumi daily
 K. Kumar (Elanthoor Kumarji) – freedom fighter and social-reformer who worked for Harijan upliftment and communal harmony
 K. Kelappan – freedom fighter and social reformer 
 Mathai Manjooran (1912–1970) – socialist revolutionary, member of the Indian Parliament, Labor Minister in the 2nd EMS communist ministry
 Mannathu Padmanabhan – founder of Nair Service Society
 M. C. Joseph – rationalist, founding editor of Yukthivadi
 Nawab Rajendran – social activist
 Sree Narayana Guru (1856–1928) – pivotal figure in the Renaissance of Kerala, social reformer, scholar, teacher, saint and Vedantin
 Sahodaran Ayyappan – social reformer, follower of Sri Narayana Guru
 Nataraja Guru – disciple of Narayana Guru
 Vakkom Moulavi (1877–1933) – social reformer, educationist, writer and journalist
 Abraham Barak Salem – Zionist, Indian nationalist, leader of the Jewish community and social activist

Religion and spirituality

Hinduism
 Adi Sankara (788–820) – saint, poet, philosopher and reviver of Hinduism in India
 Chattampi Swamikal (1853–1924) – Hindu sage and social reformer
 Vagbhatananda (1885 – October 1939) was a Hindu religious leader and Social reformer in British India.
 Sree Narayana Guru (1854–1928) – founder of Sivagiri Mutt and social reformer of India
 Tapovan Maharaj (1889–1957) – teacher of Swami Chinmayananda and Swami Sundaranand
 Swami Ranganathananda (1908–2005) – 13th president of the Ramakrishna Math and Mission
 Eknath Easwaran (1910–1999) – spiritual teacher, developed passage meditation used across traditions
 Chinmayananda (1916–1993) – founder of Chinmaya Mission
 Nitya Chaitanya Yati (1924–1999) – exponent of Advaita Vedanta
 Karunakara Guru (1927–1999) – spiritual leader, founder of Santhigiri Ashram
 Swami Bhoomananda Tirtha (1933–) – spiritual leader and the founder of Narayanashrama Tapovanam
 Swami Abhedananda  Abhedashramam Thriruvanthapuram 
 Mata Amritanandamayi (1953–) – spiritual leader and founder of Mata Amritanandamayi Math popularly known as Amma

Islam
 Panakkad Thangal
 Ahmad Kutty – Islamic scholar
 Kanthapuram A. P. Aboobacker Musliyar – Grand Mufti of India
 Cherussery Musliyar
 KT Manu Musliar
 Kalambadi Muhammad Musliyar
 Ullal Thangal
 Hyderali Shihab Thangal
 Chekannur Maulavi – progressive Islamic cleric
 MM Akbar – Muslim intellectual, comparative religion scholar
 Abdul Hakeem Azhari - Islamic scholar

Christianity 
 Philipose Mar Chrysostom – Grand Metropolitan of Malankara Marthoma Syrian Church and Marthoma XX
 Mar Yohannan Yoseph – Episcopal Bishop of the Holy Assyrian Church of the East
 Alphonsa of the Immaculate Conception – first woman of Indian origin to be canonised as a saint by the Catholic Church
 Baselios Cleemis – Cardinal-Priest of the Church of Saint Gregory VII
 Baselios Mar Thoma Paulose II – Catholicos of the Malankara Orthodox Syrian Church
 Baselios Thomas I – Catholicos of the Jacobite Syrian Christian Church
Geevarghese Mar Gregorios (Parumala Thirumeni) – First Indian canonized saint by the Malankara Orthodox Syrian Church
 George Alencherry – Cardinal-Priest of San Bernardo alle Terme
 Joseph Mar Thoma – primate of the Mar Thoma Syrian Church 
 Joy Alappat – Syro-Malabar Catholic bishop in the United States
 Joseph Parecattil – inducted as Cardinal by Pope John Paul II in June 1988
 KP Yohannan – Metropolitan Bishop of Believers Church
 Kuriakose Elias Chavara – Syro-Malabar Catholic Church saint and social reformer
 K.V. Simon – Kerala Brethren pioneer
 Mar Gregory Karotemprel – Bishop of the Syro-Malabar Catholic Eparchy of Rajkot
 P.C. John – Kerala Brethren pioneer
 Saint Euphrasia – Indian Carmelite nun of the Syro-Malabar Church
 Varkey Vithayathil – former Cardinal-Priest of San Bernardo alle Terme
 Varghese Payyappilly Palakkappilly – elevated as Venerable by the Syro-Malabar Catholic Church
 Palackal Thoma – Indian Catholic priest of the Syro-Malabar Church based in India

PRDS
Poykayil Yohannan aka Poykayil Kumara Guru Devan – activist, poet and the founder of the socio-religious movement Prathyaksha Raksha Daiva Sabha

Literature and writing

Writers

 Ajay Prabhakar – international author and researcher
 A. R. Raja Raja Varma – linguist and grammarian
 Akkitham Achuthan Namboothiri – Malayalam poet; winner of the Kendra Sahithya Academy Award for Malayalam in 1973
 Appu Nedungadi – author of Kundalatha, the first Malayalam novel
 Anita Nair – writer
 Arundhati Roy – actress turned writer, awarded the Booker Prize in 1997 for The God of Small Things, which is set in Kerala
 Balachandran Chullikkadu – poet
 Balamani Amma – poet; won the literary medal in India, the Saraswathi Samman
 Chandiroor Divakaran – poet, folk songwriter and 2011 Ambedkar Award winner
 Changampuzha Krishna Pillai (1911–1948) – poet, author of the pastoral elegy "Ramanan" (1936)
 Cherusseri Namboothiri – poet, author of Krishnagaadha (The Song of Krishna)
 D. Vinayachandran – poet
 Edasseri Govindan Nair – poet and playwright
 Faisal Kutty – lawyer, professor and columnist
 G. Sankara Kurup – poet
 George Menachery – historian, editor of The St. Thomas Christian Encyclopaedia of India, editor of The Indian Church History Classics (The Nazranies)
 Gopi Kottoor – internationally renowned poet
 Hassan Thikkodi – writer, poet, Chairman of MES Raja Residential School
 Hameed Chennamangaloor – writer, progressive Muslim intellectual, critic of religious fundamentalism
 E. Harikumar – novelist and short story writer
 Ilango Adigal – author of Silappatikaram, one of the Five Great Epics of Tamil literature; identifies himself as a Chera prince from the 2nd century CE
 Kadammanitta Ramakrishnan – Malayalam poet
 Kalakkaththu Kunchan Nambiar – poet
 Kamala Das – English poet and novelist; also wrote in Malayalam under the pen-name Madhavikkutty; first Indian woman to openly write about women's sexuality; embraced Islam under the name Kamala Suraiyya in 1999; Asian Poetry Prize, 1964; Kent Award, 1965
 Kesari Balakrishna Pillai – social thinker, literary critic
 Kottarathil Sankunni – well known author of Malayalam literature. He made significant contributions in both poetry and prose. He started compiling the legends of Kerala in 1909 and completed the work in eight volumes over a quarter of a century. "Aithihyamala" (Garland of Legends) is a collection of stories of legends prepared by Kottarathil Sankunni. The works on the legends were collected and published by Sankunni in the famous Malayalam literary magazine of the nineteenth century, the Bhashaposhini.
 Kumaran Asan – poet, also called Mahakavi Kumaran Asan, died at age 51 in a boat (named Redeemer) accident en route Alapuzha to Kollam in January 1924
 Kunjunni – Malayalam poet
 N. S. Madhavan – writer and civil servant
Manu S Pillai – author of “The Ivory Throne”
 M. Krishnan Nair – literary critic
 M. Mukundan – novelist
 Moothiringode Bhavathrāthan Namboothiripad – author and social
 Moyinkutty Vaidyar – poet
 M. P. Parameswaran – scientist turned social activist
 M. P. Paul – literary critic
 M. T. Vasudevan Nair – writer and cinema personality; Jnanpith Award, 1995
 Nalankal Krishna Pillai - writer and educationist
 Nanditha K. S. – poet
 Niranam Poets – three Malayali poets, Madhava Panikkar, Sankara Panikkar and Rama Panikkar of the Kannassa family; they lived between AD 1350 and 1450 in the Niranam village of Tiruvalla
 Nitya Chaitanya Yati – scholar and monk
 O. Chandumenon – novelist
 O. V. Vijayan – novelist and cartoonist
 O. N. V. Kurup
 P. C. Devassia (1906–2006) – Sanskrit scholar and poet who won the Sahitya Akademi Award (1980) for Sanskrit for his poem "Kristubhagavatam"
 P. Parameswaran – Director of Bharatiya Vichara Kendram; former President of Vivekanand Kendra, Kanyakumari; also known as Parameswarji
 P. F. Mathews – novelist, short story writer and screenwriter
 P. K. Gopi – poet
 P. M. Taj – writer
 Paul Zacharia – writer
 Poonthanam – poet belonging to the Bhakti school
 Sarah Joseph – writer, Novelist, Sahitya Academy winner
 Shashi Tharoor – novelist, Commonwealth Writers Prize, 1991; previous Under-Secretary-General (Communication and Public Information) of the United Nations, Deputy Minister of External affairs
 S. K. Pottekkatt – author winner of the Jnanpith award of 1980
 Shreekumar Varma – novelist, award-winning playwright, poet, children's author
 Sugathakumari – Indian poet and activist
 Sukumar Azhikode – teacher, critic and orator
 Thakazhi Sivasankara Pillai – novelist and short story writer; Jnanpith Award in 1984
 Thirunalloor Karunakaran – poet, scholar, teacher and leftist intellectual
 Thunchaththu Ramanujan Ezhuthachan – architect of modern Malayalam; poet 
 Ulloor S Parameswara Iyer – poet
 Uroob – writer, novelist, Sahitya Academy winner, winner of president of India's silver medal
 Vaikom Muhammad Basheer – writer, philosopher
 Vakkom Abdul Khader Moulavi – publisher, social reformer, and a leader of the progressive Islahi Movement in Kerala
 Vallathol Narayana Menon – Mahaakavi; founder of Kerala Kalamandalam,
 Vayalar Ramavarma – lyricist
 Vayalar Sarath Chandra varma – Malayalam film
 Vijayan, M. N – writer, literary critic, social activist
 Vrindavanam Venugopalan – writer, journalist and educationalist
 Vyloppilli Sreedhara Menon – Malayalam poet
 V. Madhusoodanan Nair – Malayalam poet and winner of the Kendra Sahitya Akademi Award for Malayalam in 2019
 Yusuf Ali Kechery – poet, lyricist

Journalists
 
 O. Abdurahman – Editor-in-charge of Madhyamam
 Sunnykutty Abraham – COO and Chief News Editor of Jaihind TV; political analyst
 BRP Bhaskar - senior journalist and human rights-social activist
 T. N. Gopakumar – Editor-in-Chief, Asianet News
 K. Kumar of Travancore – Gandhian reformer, nationalist and Freedom Fighter who revived and edited "Swadeshabhimani" run by the deported Swadeshabhimani Ramakrishnana Pillai
 Faisal Kutty – lawyer and columnist for Express Tribune, Toronto Star, Middle East Eye and Madhyamam Daily
 V. K. Madhavan Kutty – Former Editor of the Malayalam daily Mathrubhumi, and a founder director of satellite channel Asianet
 K. C. Mammen Mappillai – founder of Malayala Manorama
 Sebastian Paul – Media critic
 Nisha Pillai – BBC newsreader
 Swadeshabhimani Ramakrishna Pillai the deported nationalist who edited the Swadeshabhimani newspaper
 Kummanam Rajasekharan – Managing Director of Malayalam daily Janmabhumi, General Secretary Hindu Aikya Vedi

Film and media

Models
 Lakshmi Menon
 Nafisa Joseph
 Nina Manuel
 Parvathy Omanakuttan
 Sana Khan
 Sheetal Menon
 Surelee Joseph

Actresses
 Ambika
 Ambika Sukumaran
 Ann Augustine
 Asin 
 Bhavana
 Catherine Tresa
 Geetu Mohandas – Kerala State Film Award for Best Actress (2004)
 K. P. A. C. Lalitha – National Film Award for Best Supporting Actress (1990)
 Kalpana
 Kaviyoor Ponnamma
 Kavya Madhavan
 Lakshmi Menon
 Lalitha
 Liza Koshy
 Manju Warrier – Special Jury Award (National)
 Meera Jasmine – National Film Award for Best Actress (2004)
 Monisha Unni – National Film Award for Best Actress (1986)
 Namitha Pramod
 Navya Nair
 Nayantara man
 Nazriya Nazim
 Neha Dhupia
 Nithya Menen
 Padmini
 Ragini
 Remya Nambeesan
 Revathi Menon
 Rima Kallingal
 Samvrutha Sunil 
 Shobana – Padma Shri recipient, National Film Award for Best Actress (1993,2001)
 Shweta Menon
 Siddhi Mahajankatti 
 Sindhu Menon
 Sukumari – Padma Shri recipient
 Trisha Krishnan
 Urvashi – National Film Award for Best Supporting Actress (2005)
 Vidya Balan

Actors

 Balachandra Menon – Padma Shri recipient; National Award winner for acting and direction; holder of a world record
 Bharath Gopi – actor, Padma Shri recipient and winner of the national award for Best Actor in 1977
 Shankar (actor) – Romantic Hero of Malayalam in the eighties.
 Dileep
 Dulquer Salmaan
 Fahadh Faasil
 Jagathy Sreekumar
 Jayan – greatest superstar actor in Malayalam film for ever.
 Jayaram – Padma Shri recipient
 Jayasurya – actor, winner of the national for Special Jury Mention in 2016
 John Abraham
Kalabhavan Mani – actor; National Award for special jury
 M.N. Nambiar
 Madhu – actor, winner of Padma Shri
 Mammootty – Padma Shri recipient; three-time National Award winner
 Mohanlal – Padma Shri recipient; two-time National Film Award winner
 Murali – actor and winner of the national award for Best Actor in 2002
 Naveen Andrews – Hollywood actor
 Nedumudi Venu
 Nivin Pauly
 Prem Nazir – Padma Bhushan recipient; holds four Guinness records
 Premji – stage and film actor
 Prithviraj Sukumaran – actor; Kerala State Award winner 2006
 Salim Kumar – actor, winner of the national award for Best Actor in 2010 
 Sathyan
 Shishir Kurup – Hollywood actor
 Suraj Sharma – Hollywood and Bollywood actor
 Suraj Venjaramoodu – actor and winner of the National award for Best Actor in 2013
 Suresh Gopi – actor and winner of the national award for Best Actor in 1998
 Suresh Menon – Bollywood comedian and actor
 Thikkurussi Sukumaran Nair – Padma Shri recipient; actor; winner of the national award for Best Supporting Actor in 1959
 Tovino Thomas

Film producer and directors

 Alberrt Antoni – film director 
 Appachan – film director and producer
 Bejoy Nambiar – film director
 Benny Mathews – Hollywood director
 Bharath Gopi – film, drama producer, director and actor
 Bharathan – filmmaker
 Blessy – filmmaker
 Fazil – film director and writer
 G. Aravindan – film director and cartoonist
 G. Devarajan – music director
 Gowtham Menon – Tamil film director
 I.V. Sasi – film director
 Jayaraj – director
 John Matthew Matthan – Hindi film director 
 Joshiy – film director
 K P Kumaran – filmmaker
 Kunchacko – film producer
 Lohithadas – film director and writer
 Madhu Muttam – script writer
Mira Nair – Hollywood film director, BAFTA Award recipient
 M. Night Shyamalan – Hollywood film director
 M. T. Vasudevan Nair – writer and cinema personality; Jnanpith Award, 1995
 P.F. Mathews – script writer, recipient of National Award
 P.T.Kunju Muhammed – film director and writer
 P. Padmarajan (1945–1991) – film director
 Priyadarshan – film director
 Rajeev Ravi – cinematographer, director, producer,  National Film Award for Best Cinematography
 Ranjith – film director and writer
 Resul Pookutty – sound engineer, first Oscar-winning Indian (for film Slumdog Millionaire)
 Rosshan Andrrews – director
 Rupesh Paul – Hollywood director
 Sabu Cyril – art director
 Sangeeth Sivan – director
 V.R.Sankar – film director and writer
 Santosh Sivan – director and cinematographer
 Sathyan Anthikkad – Malayalam film director
 Shaji Kylas – action film director
 Shajith Koyeri – National Film Awards-winning sound designer
 Shaji N. Karun – film director
 Sibi Malayil – Malayalam film director
 Siddique – filmmaker
 Sohanlal – director and writer
 Sreenivasan – writer, director and actor
 TK Rajeev Kumar – filmmaker

Music

 Alex Paul – music director
 Benny Dayal – playback singer
 Berny-Ignatius – music director duo
 Chitra – playback singer
 Deepak Dev – music composer, playback singer
 G. Venugopal – playback singer
 Gireesh Puthenchery – lyricist and writer
 Gopi Sundar – music director and keyboard artist
 Jassie Gift – music composer, playback singer
 Kaithapram Damodaran Namboothiri – lyricist
 Kannur Rajan – music composer
 Kozhikode Abdul Kader –  playback singer
 KK (Krishnakumar Kunnath) – playback singer
 M. G. Sreekumar – playback singer and music director
 M. Jayachandran – music director and playback singer 
 Madhu Balakrishnan – playback singer
 Manjari Babu – playback singer
 Mridula Warrier – playback singer
 Nikhil Mathew – playback singer
 Ouseppachan – music director
 P. Jayachandran – playback singer
 Pradip Somasundaran – playback singer
 Rahul Raj – music composer, playback singer
 Raveendran – music director
 Sabrina Setlur – German rapper and singer
 Sharreth – music director and playback singer
 Sruthy Sasidharan – playback singer
 Stephen Devassy – pianist, music composer
 Sudeep Kumar – playback singer
 Sujatha Mohan – playback singer
 Swetha Mohan – playback singer
 Unni Menon – playback singer
 Unnikrishnan – playback singer
 Vaishnav Girish – playback singer
 Vayalar Ramavarma – lyricist
 Vayalar Sarath Chandra Varma – lyricist
 Vidhu Prathap – playback singer
 Vijay Yesudas – playback singer
 Yesudas – classical singer and musician

Artists, architects, painters, sculptors
Painters

 Raja Ravi Varma
 K. C. S. Paniker – founder of Cholamandal Artists' Village
 Namboothiri – painter, cartoonist and sculptor
 T. K. Padmini
 A. Ramachandran
 C. N. Karunakaran – Chairman of Kerala Lalitakala Academi
 Akkitham Narayanan
 Balan Nair
 Sekar Ayyanthole – art teacher, former president of Kerala Chithrakala Parishath
 M. V. Devan – artist and writer
 Mubarack Nissa (born 1981), contemporary artist and curator
 Chitra Ramanathan - Contemporary artist, painter
 Bose Krishnamachari
 Paris Viswanathan
 Yusuf Arakkal
 Kavitha Balakrishnan – artist and art historian
 V. S. Valiathan – artist, Raja Ravivarma award winner
 C.L Porinchukutty – Raja Ravi Varma Awardee for 2011
 K. Janardanan

Architects
 Eugene Pandala – architect and artist

Sculptors
 Kanayi Kunhiraman – sculptor, former Chairman of Kerala Lalitakala Academy
 Balan Nambiar – sculptor, painter and research scholar
 Sasikrishnan – sculptor

Cartoonists
 Abu Abraham – cartoonist
 Cartoonist Shankar (1902–1989) – political cartoonist
 K. S. Pillai (1919–1978) – political cartoonist
 O. V. Vijayan – cartoonist, writer
 P. K. Manthri – artist, cartoonist
 Gopikrishnan – cartoonist
 S. Jithesh – performing cartoonist
 Yesudasan – cartoonist; former Chairman of Kerala Lalitakala Academy

Sports

 (C) denotes players who have captained the national side.

Athletics
 Anil Kumar
 Anilda Thomas
 Anju Bobby George
 Bobby Aloysius
 C. K. Lakshmanan
 Chitra K. Soman
 Ivan Jacob
 Jincy Phillip
 Jisna Mathew
 Joseph Abraham
 K.M. Beenamol
 K. M. Binu
 K. T. Irfan
 M. D. Valsamma 
 Mayookha Johny
 Mercy Kuttan
 Mohammad Anas
 Molly Chacko
 O. P. Jaisha
 P. T. Usha 
 P. U. Chitra
 Preeja Sreedharan
 Renjith Maheshwary
 Rosa Kutty
 Shiny Abraham
 Sini Jose
 Sinimol Paulose
 Suresh Babu
 T. C. Yohannan
 Tintu Lukka

Badminton
 George Thomas
 Jaseel P. Ismail
 P. C. Thulasi
 Prannoy Kumar
 Sanave Thomas
 U. Vimal Kumar
 V. Diju

Basketball
 Geethu Anna Jose (C)
 P. S. Jeena (C)

Canoeing
 Siji Kumar Sadanandan

Chess
 Arjun Vishnuvardhan
 Geetha Narayanan Gopal
 N R Anil Kumar
 Nihal Sarin
 Soumya Swaminathan

Cricket

India
 Abey Kuruvilla
 Abhishek Nayar
 Ajay Varma
 Basil Thampi
 Bhaskar Pillai
 Devdutt Padikkal
 Jalaj Saxena
 K. N. Ananthapadmanabhan
 Karun Nair
 Kelappan Thampuran (cricketer, born 1937)
 Kelappan Thampuran (cricketer, born 1925)
 P. Ranganathan
 Padmanabhan Prasanth
 Prasanth Parameswaran
 Raiphi Gomez
 Rohan Prem
 S Sreesanth 
 Sachin Baby
 Sandeep Warrier
 Sanju Samson
 Shreyas Iyer
 Sony Cheruvathur
 Sujith Somasunder
 Sunil Valson
 Tinu Yohannan
 VA Jagadeesh

Other countries
 Krishna Chandran (Uae)

Football
 Anas Edathodika
 Anil Kumar
 Ashique Kuruniyan
 C.K. Vineeth
 C. V. Pappachan
 I. M. Vijayan (C)
 Jiju Jacob
 Jo Paul Ancheri (C)
 K. V. Dhanesh
Mashoor Shereef
 Maymol Rocky
 Mohammed Rafi
 Mundiyath Devdas
 O. Chandrashekar
 P. B. A. Saleh
 Pappachen Pradeep
 Prasanth Karuthadathkuni
 Rahul K.P
 Rino Anto 
 S. S. Narayan
 Sahal Abdul Samad
 Suhair V P
 T. Abdul Rahman
 Thomas Varghese (Thiruvalla Pappan)
 U. Sharaf Ali
 Usman Ashik
 Victor Manjila
 V. P. Sathyan (C)
V.P. Suhair

Hockey
 Earnest Goodsir-Cullen
 Dinesh Nayak
 Helen Mary
 Manuel Frederick
 P. R. Sreejesh (C)

Kabbadi
 Shabeer Bapu Sharfudheen

Volleyball
 Aswani Kiran(C)
 Cyril C. Valloor (C)
 Jimmy George (C)
 K. J. Kapil Dev (C)
 K. Udayakumar (C)
 Minimol Abraham (C)
 Soorya Thottangal
 Tom Joseph (C)

Shooting
 Elizabeth Koshy

Swimming
 Sebastian Xavier
 Sajan Prakash

Table tennis
 A. Radhika Suresh

Activists
 K. V. Rabiya – literacy campaigner, social worker
 Tiffany Brar – blind social worker
 Pramada Menon – queer feminist activist, stand-up comedian, gender and sexuality consultant, and co-founder of Creating Resources for Empowerment in Action
 Sally Varma – animal activist, humane educator, founder of Save A Life and Senior Campaigner in the Farm Animal Protection Campaign of Humane Society International/India
 Kannan Gopinathan – former Indian Administrative Service officer, now engaged in the Citizenship Amendment Act protests

Performing artists 
 Mani Madhava Chakyar (1989–1991) – Koodiyattam and Chakyar Koothu artist, Natya Shastra scholar
 Gopinath Muthukad – magician
 Tirur Nambissan – Kathakali singer
 Kalamandalam Hyderali – Kathakali singer
 Kalamandalam Gopi – Kathakali artist
 Kottakkal Sivaraman – Kathakali artist
 Guru Gopinath (1908–1987) – classical dancer and author
 Guru Chandrasekharan (1916–1998) – dancer and choreographer
 Mrinalini Sarabhai – dancer
 Kalamandalam Kshemavathy – dancer
 Athira – violin prodigy, Guinness World record holder
 Kim Thayil – guitarist
 Haripad Murukadas (b. 1971) – Nadaswaram player, music educator
 Paul Varghese – comedian
 Stephen Devassy – pianist and composer
 Balabhaskar – violinist and composer
 Chenganoor Raman Pillai – Kathakali artist

References

Kerala